Swinton is a surname in both Scotland and England (see Clan Swinton). Notable people with this surname include the following:

Archibald Swinton (1731-1804), Scottish Captain of the East India Company, head of Mughal Emperor Shah Alam II's mission to George III of Britain in 1766
Ernest Dunlop Swinton (1868–1951), British Army officer and writer
Sir John Swinton, 14th of that Ilk (14th century), English soldier of Scottish origin, retainer of John of Gaunt (erroneously called Thomas in one major source)
John Swinton (1703–1777), British writer, academic, FRS, Church of England clergyman and orientalist
John Swinton (journalist) (1830–1901), American editorial writer at The New York Times and The New York Sun
John Swinton of Kimmerghame (born 1925), general (father of Tilda), former Major General of the British Army and former Lord Lieutenant of Berwickshire
Samuel Swinton (ca 1729–1799), Scottish captain of the Royal Navy. The character The Scarlet Pimpernel was based on his life
Tilda Swinton (born 1960), English actress
William Elgin Swinton (1900–1994), Scottish-Canadian paleontologist, FRSC

English-language surnames
Scottish surnames